was a Japanese female geisha and  singer, who performed in the "New-" style of singing.  came to be most well known, alongside another popular geisha singer, in the " Era".

Career 
 was born on 6 November 1904 in  District,  Prefecture.

Around 1928, a geisha from the same geisha district named  recorded a number of hit songs for Victor of Japan. A year later, she signed an exclusive contract with Victor of Japan, debuting with the song  in 1931. In 1932, her B-side song titled  ("Willow Rain") became her first hit.  released the song  in the same year, with the song becoming a big hit in 1933, selling 350,000 copies in 3 months, with a total of 600,000 copies. However, the song also angered members of the Home Ministry in its description of illicit sexual relations.

In 1933,  and  released the duet  in June or July during Bon Festival. Also in 1933,  left the geisha world to concentrate on her new profession as a recording artist, dropping the  name and becoming simply "", after which released another hit, .

In the spring season of 1934,  and  released the song , which also became a big hit. In the same year, she received the name  in an open exhibition.

In the late 1930s, she and other singers were called to China to perform for Japanese troops in China. , having fallen ill whilst on the trip, met military physician . The two became a couple and married in 1949. During the wartime,  recorded the song , which became a hit.

Her song  became a hit and was used for a movie of the same name.

In 1961,  transferred to  Records where she recorded mostly  and  songs. Around the mid 1960s,  went back to Victor of Japan to rerecord some of her older hits. By the mid 1960s, so-called "oldies" (older singers and songs) were booming, with many older singers rerecording stereo versions of their hits. A TV program called  (Nostalgic Songs), which debuted in 1968, featured  as a regular performer until just before her death. In 1971,  received a Purple Ribbon award, followed by a second in 1974.

In June 1974,  was diagnosed with lung cancer and died on 21 June 1974 at  Hospital in Tokyo, aged 69.

performances

New Year's Eve performance competition television special that has aired annually since 1953.

 4th  (located at )Song performed: 
 6th  (located at  Hall)Song performed: 
 7th  (located at Tokyo  Theater)Song performed:

Discography 
 , 1932
 , 1933
 , 1934
 , 1934
 , 1936
 , 1940
 , 1948

References

External links 
 

1904 births
1974 deaths
Geishas
People from Niigata (city)
Musicians from Niigata Prefecture
20th-century Japanese women singers
20th-century Japanese singers